Iryna Ihorivna Herashchenko (born 10 March 1995) is a Ukrainian high jumper. She competed at the 2016 Summer Olympics and 2020 Summer Olympics, finishing 10th and 4th respectively.

Iryna has a personal best of 2.00 m (outdoors) and 1.98 m (indoors).

Achievements

References

External links

1995 births
Living people
Ukrainian female high jumpers
Sportspeople from Kyiv
World Athletics Championships athletes for Ukraine
Athletes (track and field) at the 2016 Summer Olympics
Olympic athletes of Ukraine
Universiade medalists in athletics (track and field)
Universiade silver medalists for Ukraine
Medalists at the 2019 Summer Universiade
Medalists at the 2017 Summer Universiade
Athletes (track and field) at the 2020 Summer Olympics
21st-century Ukrainian women